Gabriela Rosa (born October 12, 1966) is a Dominican-American former politician. After being elected to the New York State Assembly in 2012, Rosa resigned her office in June 2014 as part of a federal plea deal. A native of the Dominican Republic, Rosa admitted to lying to immigration authorities about a sham marriage. She was sentenced to a year and a day in prison.

Life and career
Born in the Dominican Republic, Rosa settled in New York City in 1994. She served as chief of staff to New York City Councilman Miguel Martinez and also worked for Assemblymember Herman D. Farrell, Jr. In 2005, Rosa became a United States citizen.

In 2012, Rosa was elected to the New York State Assembly as a Democrat.

Prosecution, guilty plea, and imprisonment
On June 27, 2014, Rosa pleaded guilty to two crimes in United States District Court. Rosa admitted to lying about a sham marriage to become a United States citizen and to failing to disclose income and assets in a bankruptcy filing in 2011. Rosa resigned her Assembly seat as part of the plea deal and was later sentenced to a year and a day in prison.

Notes

1966 births
Living people
Dominican Republic emigrants to the United States
People with acquired American citizenship
People from Santo Domingo
Politicians from New York City
Women state legislators in New York (state)
Democratic Party members of the New York State Assembly
New York (state) politicians convicted of crimes
Hispanic and Latino American state legislators in New York (state)
Hispanic and Latino American women in politics
American politicians of Dominican Republic descent
21st-century American women